The Australian cricket team toured Pakistan in March and April 2022 to play three Tests, three One Day Internationals (ODIs) and one Twenty20 International (T20I) match. The Test series formed part of the 2021–2023 ICC World Test Championship, and the ODI series formed part of the inaugural 2020–2023 ICC Cricket World Cup Super League. It was Australia's first tour to Pakistan since 1998. The Test series was the first time that the teams played for the Benaud–Qadir Trophy, named after former international cricketers Richie Benaud and Abdul Qadir.

The first Test ended in a draw, with the teams shaking hands before the scheduled close of play on day five. Across the match, Pakistan's aggregate score was 728 for 4, with Australia's Steve Smith saying that the wicket was "dead" and benign". The pitch was later rated as "below average" by match referee Ranjan Madugalle. The second Test also finished in a draw on the fifth day, after Australia had declared on 556/9 in their first innings, with Pakistan's Babar Azam scoring 196 runs in the fourth innings. Australia won the third Test by 115 runs in the final session of play on day five to win the series 1–0. It was Australia's first Test series win in Asia since 2011, and their first Test win in Asia since 2017.

Australia won the opening ODI match by 88 runs, after Travis Head scored a century. In the second match, Australia scored 348/8 from their 50 overs, with Ben McDermott scoring his first ODI century. In reply, Pakistan made 349/4 in 49 overs, with centuries from Imam-ul-Haq and Babar Azam, to record Pakistan's highest successful run chase in an ODI match. Pakistan won the third ODI by nine wickets to take the series 2–1, with Babar Azam scoring another century. It was Pakistan's first ODI series win against Australia since June 2002. Australia finished the tour by winning the one-off T20I match by three wickets.

The tour was deemed a success with former players from both teams praising the teams and requesting for more international cricket in Pakistan. Pakistan's Shahid Afridi said that "I hope other teams will follow their footsteps & visit Pakistan", with Shoaib Akhtar also saying that he was "glad the whole series with Australia went smooth". Australia's Shane Watson also said that the tour was "great thing for world cricket".

Background
In September 2021, Cricket Australia said they were monitoring the situation in Pakistan and will "talk with the relevant authorities once more information becomes known", after New Zealand cancelled their tour of Pakistan due to a security threat. In November 2021, the Pakistan Cricket Board (PCB) confirmed the fixtures for the tour. On 4 February 2022, the PCB made some minor changes to the tour schedule. The limited overs matches were moved from Lahore to Rawalpindi, and the venues of the first two Test matches were swapped around, with Cricket Australia endorsing the tour.

After initial fears that some Australian players may opt out of the tour, Australia named a full-strength Test squad on 8 February 2022. Originally, the Test matches would have overlapped with Australia's T20I tour of New Zealand. However, on 9 February 2022, that tour was abandoned after there were no managed isolation quarantine (MIQ) spots available for the Australian team. On 27 February 2022, the Australian team arrived in Pakistan, landing at Islamabad International Airport.
On 18 March 2022, the limited overs matches were moved from Rawalpindi to Lahore, due to political tension in Islamabad.

Squads

Pakistan also named Kamran Ghulam, Mohammad Abbas, Naseem Shah, Sarfaraz Ahmed and Yasir Shah as reserve players for the Test series. Prior to the start of the Test series, Mohammad Nawaz was ruled out of Pakistan's squad with a foot injury. Mohammad Haris was also added to Pakistan's reserve list for the Test matches. Hasan Ali and Faheem Ashraf were both ruled out of Pakistan's squad for the first Test due to injuries, with Iftikhar Ahmed and Mohammad Wasim added to their squad. On 1 March 2022, Haris Rauf tested positive for COVID-19. As a result, travelling reserve Naseem Shah was added to Pakistan's squad for the first Test. Faheem Ashraf, who was ruled out of the first Test due to an injury, was also initially ruled out of the second Test after testing positive for COVID-19. However, less than 24 hours later, Faheem was given the go-ahead to join Pakistan's Test squad after clearing a rapid antigen test. On 20 March 2022, Zahid Mahmood replaced Mohammad Nawaz in Pakistan's ODI and T20I squads after not recovering from his foot injury. Zahid was also named as cover for Shadab Khan.

Ahead of the tour, Michael Neser was ruled out of the series and was replaced by Mark Steketee in the Australian Test team. Australia also named Sean Abbott and Brendan Doggett as standby players for the tour. Kane Richardson was ruled out of Australia's ODI and T20I squads due to a hamstring injury. Ben Dwarshuis was named as his replacement. Steve Smith was also ruled out of Australia's limited overs matches, due to an elbow problem, and was replaced by Mitchell Swepson. Mitchell Marsh was ruled out of Australia's squad for the first ODI due to a hip injury, before being ruled out of all of the white-ball matches. Ashton Agar was ruled out of Australia's squad for the ODI matches after testing positive for COVID-19 with Matt Renshaw named as his replacement.

Test series

1st Test

2nd Test

3rd Test

ODI series

1st ODI

2nd ODI

3rd ODI

Only T20I

References

External links
 Series home at ESPN Cricinfo

2022 in Pakistani cricket
2022 in Australian cricket
International cricket competitions in 2021–22
Australian cricket tours of Pakistan